= Results of the 1891 Canadian federal election =

1891 Canadian federal election

== Results by Province ==
=== British Columbia ===
Results in British Columbia
Party	Seats	Second	Third	Votes	%	+/-
Conservative	5			4,009	71.58	
Liberals		3	1	1,592	28.42	
Liberal–Conservative	1			0	0	
Total	6			5,601	100.0	

=== Manitoba ===
Results in Manitoba
Party	Seats	Second	Votes	%	+/-
Liberals	1	3	8,281	46.92	
Liberal–Conservative	3		7,150	40.51	
Conservative	1	1	2,219	12.57	
Total	5		17,650	100.0	

=== New Brunswick ===
Results in New Brunswick
Party	Seats	Second	Third	Votes	%	+/-
Conservative	10	4		28,639	46.16	
Liberals	4	9		24,165	38.95	
Unknown			1	3,503	5.65	
Liberal–Conservative	2			2,162	3.48	
Independent		1		1,858	2.99	
Independent Liberal		1		1,719	2.77	
Total	16			62,046	100.0	

=== Northwest Territories ===
Results in Northwest Territories
Party	Seats	Second	Votes	%	+/-
Conservative	4	2	8,371	81.03	
Liberals		2	1,960	18.97	
Total	4		10,331	100.0	

=== Nova Scotia ===
Results in Nova Scotia
Party	Seats	Second	Third	Votes	%	+/-
Liberals	5	11	4	38,531	43.63	
Conservative	12	4		36,967	41.86	
Liberal–Conservative	4	1		9,565	10.83	
Unknown		2		2,781	3.15	
Progressive			2	468	0.53	
Total	21			88,312	100.0	

=== Ontario ===
Results in Ontario
Party	Seats	Second	Third	Fourth	Fifth	Votes	%	+/-
Liberals	44	43	2		1	180,004	48.51	
Conservative	39	38	2			154,777	41.71	
Liberal–Conservative	7	3				19,387	5.22	
Unknown		3	3	1		7,407	2	
Independent Conservative	1	1				4,619	1.24	
Equal Rights		1		1		2,455	0.66	
Independent	1					2,417	0.65	
Total	92					371,066	100.0	

=== Prince Edward Island ===
Results in Prince Edward Island
Party	Seats	Second	Third	Votes	%	+/-
Conservative	2	2	2	17,892	48.54	
Liberals	3	1	1	15,112	41	
Independent Liberal	1			3,854	10.46	
Total	6			36,858	100.0	

=== Quebec ===
Results in Quebec
Party	Seats	Second	Third	Votes	%	+/-
Liberals	33	22	1	80,926	43.34	
Conservative	24	31	3	79,270	42.45	
Independent Conservative	2	1		11,175	5.98	
Unknown		5		6,702	3.59	
Liberal–Conservative	3	1		5,296	2.84	
Independent	1	1		2,082	1.12	
Nationalist Conservative	1			1,271	0.68	
Nationalist	1			0	0	
Total	65			186,722	100.0	
